Hans Makart (28 May 1840 – 3 October 1884) was a 19th-century Austrian academic history painter, designer, and decorator. Makart was a prolific painter whose ideas significantly influenced the development of visual art in Austria-Hungary, Germany, and beyond.

Life

Makart was the son of a chamberlain at the Mirabell Palace, born in the former residence of the prince-archbishops of Salzburg, the city in which Mozart had been born. Initially, he received his training in painting at the Vienna Academy between 1850 and 1851 from Johann Fischbach. While in the Academy, German art was under the rule of a classicism, which was entirely intellectual and academic—clear and precise drawing, sculpturesque modelling, and pictorial erudition were esteemed above all. Makart, who was a poor draughtsman, but who had a passionate and sensual love of color, was impatient to escape the routine of art school drawing. For his fortune, he was found by his instructors to be devoid of all talent and forced to leave the Vienna Academy.

He went to Munich, and after two years of independent study attracted the attention of Karl Theodor von Piloty, under whose guidance, between 1861 and 1865 he developed his painting style.  During these years, Makart also travelled to London, Paris and Rome to further his studies. The first picture he painted under Piloty, Lavoisier in Prison, though it was considered timid and conventional, attracted attention by its sense of color.  In his next work, The Knight and the Water Nymphs, he first displayed the decorative qualities to which he afterwards sacrificed everything else in his work. His fame became established in the next year, with two works, Modern Amoretti and The Plague in Florence. His painting Romeo and Juliet was soon after bought by the Austrian emperor for the Vienna Museum, and Makart was invited to come to Vienna by the aristocracy.

The prince Von Hohenlohe provided Makart with an old foundry at the Gusshausstraße 25 to use as a studio. He gradually turned it into an impressive place full of sculptures, flowers, musical instruments, requisites and jewellery that he used to create classical settings for his portraits, mainly of women. Eventually his studio looked like a salon and became a social meeting point in Vienna. Cosima Wagner described it as a "wonder of decorative beauty, a sublime lumber-room". His luxurious studio served as a  model for a great many upper middle-class living rooms.

 
The opulent, semi-public spaces of the Makart atelier were the scene of a recurring rendezvous between the artist and his public. Makart became the mediator between different levels of society: he created a socially ambiguous sphere in which nobility and bourgeoisie could encounter one another in mutual veneration of the master, and aestheticized the burgeoning self-awareness of the bourgeoisie by means of historical models drawn from the world of the aristocracy. In this way, an artist like Makart lived out the image that high society had created of him.

Makart became the acknowledged leader of the artistic life of Vienna, which in the 1870s passed through a period of feverish activity. A chief result of this activity are the sumptuously decorated public buildings of the Ringstraße. He not only practised painting, but was also an interior designer, costume designer, furniture designer, and decorator, and his work decorated most of the public spaces of the era. His work engendered the term "Makartstil", or "Makart style", which completely characterized the era.

In 1879, Makart designed a pageant organised to celebrate the Silver Wedding Anniversary of the Imperial couple, emperor Franz Joseph I and his wife Elisabeth of Bavaria —he designed, single-handedly, the costumes, scenic setting, and triumphal cars. This became known as the "Makart-parade", and gave the people of Vienna the chance to dress up in historical costumes and be transported back into the past for a few hours. At the head of the parade was a float for artists, led by Makart on a white horse. His festivals became an institution in Vienna which lasted up until the 1960s. In the same year of the first parade, Makart became a Professor at the Vienna Academy.

Makart's painting The Entry of Charles V into Antwerp caused some controversy, because Charles V was depicted arriving in a procession surrounded by nude virgins (it was considered offensive to include nudes in such a relatively modern scene). In the United States, the painting fell under the proscription of Anthony Comstock, which secured Makart's fame there. The American public desired at once to see what Comstock was persecuting, so they could tell whether he was acting correctly or in error.

In 1882, emperor Franz Joseph I ordered the building  of the Villa Hermes at Lainz (near Vienna) for his empress and specified the bedroom decoration to be inspired from Shakespeare's Midsummer Night's Dream. Makart designed for him a dreamworld decoration as a large painting (1882) that is still extant. Unfortunately his design was never executed after his early death in 1884. His collection of antiques and art consisted of 1083 pieces and was put up for auction by art-dealer H.O. Miethke.
  
Salzburg's Makart Square, or Makartplatz, was named after the painter.

Art

The "Makartstil", which determined the culture of an entire era in Vienna, was an aestheticism the likes of which hadn't been seen before him and has not been replicated to this day. Called the "magician of colors", he painted in brilliant colors and fluid forms, which placed the design and the aesthetic of the work before all else. Often to heighten the strength of his colors he introduced asphalt into his paint, which has led to some deterioration in his paintings over the years. The paintings were usually large-scale and theatrical productions of historical motifs. Works such as The Papal Election reveal Makart's skill in the bold use of color to convey drama as well as his later developed virtuoso draughtsmanship.

Makart was deeply interested in the interaction of all the visual arts and thus in the implementation of the idea of the "total work of art" which dominated discussions on the arts in the 19th century. This was the ideal which he realised in magnificent festivities which he organised and centred on himself. The 1879 Makart-parade was the culmination of these endeavors. Makart was also a friend of the composer Richard Wagner, and it can be argued that the two developed the same concepts and stylistic tendencies in their differing art forms: a concern for embedding motifs of history and mythology in a framework of aestheticism, making their respective works historical pageants.

Makart's work, like those of other academic artists of the time, consisted of allegorical painting and history painting as seen in Catherina Carnaro, Dianas Hunt, The Entry of Charles V into Antwerp, Abundantia , Spring, Summer, The Death of Cleopatra, The Five Senses, and Bacchus and Ariadne. He was considered the Austrian rival to the French William-Adolphe Bouguereau. Within Austria, his nearest competitor was considered to be Hans Canon, and he was associated with the sculptor Viktor Tilgner, who travelled with him to Italy.

Influence

Aside from his clear influence on the academic art and high culture of Vienna at the time, Makart also influenced a range of painters and decorators who followed him, including many who rebelled against his style—the most notable being Gustav Klimt, who is said to have idolized him. Klimt's early style is based in historicism and has clear similarities to Makart's paintings. The entire decorative focus of the Secession, the Austrian Art Nouveau of which Klimt was a part, arose in an environment in which Makart had put the decorative aspects of art in the forefront. Some have also suggested that primacy of sexual symbolism in Art Nouveau artworks were influenced by the sensuality in many of Makart's paintings.

Works

See also
 List of Orientalist artists
 Orientalism

External links

 
 Makart page at Vienna's Historisches Museum Wien
 
 Article on the Ringstraße era
 Makart's entry in the World's Columbian Exposition of 1893 

1840 births
1884 deaths
19th-century Austrian painters
19th-century German male artists
19th-century painters of historical subjects
Austrian male painters
Academic art
Munich School
Orientalist painters
Artists from Salzburg